Chancey Williams (born August 24, 1981) is an American country music singer-songwriter and former saddle bronc rider.  He and fellow Wyoming artist and rodeo cowboy Chris LeDoux are the only two individuals to compete in the rodeo and perform on the main stage of Cheyenne Frontier Days.

Chancey Williams "3rd Street" released May 22, 2020. It is their 5th studio album.

Early life 
Chancey Williams was raised on a ranch near the small town of Moorcroft, Wyoming. Williams  followed his dad as a saddle bronc rider, going to the National High School Rodeo Finals, the College National Finals and won two rounds at Cheyenne Frontier Days. Williams has a total of four degrees, including a Bachelor's degree in Political Science and a Master's Degree in Public Administration from the University of Wyoming.

Career 
Williams and his former drummer, lifelong friend Travis DeWitt, started the Younger Brothers Band with the initial goal of entering a high school talent contest. In 2008 they were joined by Wyatt Springsteen (lead guitar and vocal harmonies) and Brooke Latka (fiddle and vocal harmonies). In 2012 Jack Robbins (bass) joined the band. The studio album Honkey Tonk Road was released in 2008, Highway Junkie in 2011 and, recently, the Billboard charting Echo. Chancey Williams and the Younger Brothers Band have sold, between digital downloads and CD sales, more than 40,000 records. In the Fall of 2013, Williams signed with HomeSlice Artist Management, a subsidiary of the HomeSlice Group, an entertainment and media company that is the worldwide exclusive licensing agent  of the Sturgis Motorcycle Rally. Williams signed with WME, the industries premier booking agency in Fall of 2019. On February 4, 2021, via the office twitter page, the departure of founding member and drummer Travis DeWitt was announced.

Discography

Studio albums 
 HonkyTonk Road
 Released 2008
 Label: Self-Released
 Highway Junkie
 Released 2011
 Label: Self-Released
 Echo
Released 2013
Label: Self-Released
Peaked at #10 on Billboards Mountain-Heatseeker Chart
Rodeo Cold Beer
Released 2017
Label : Younger Brothers Records
 3rd Street
 Released 2020
 Label: Self-Released

Singles 
"Six Figure Job" (2008)
"She Loves me Anyway" (2011)
"Worth the Whiskey" (2013)
"Down with That" (2015)
"Silhouette" (2016)

Music videos

References

American country music groups
Musical groups from Wyoming
People from Crook County, Wyoming